The 2020 New Mexico Republican presidential primary took place on June 2, 2020, as one of 7 contests scheduled for that day in the Republican Party primaries for the 2020 presidential election.

Results

References 

Republican primary
New Mexico
June 2020 events in the United States
New Mexico Republican primaries